Bowden Glacier is a glacier lying on the southeast flank of Salient Ridge that flows northeast to Blue Glacier, Victoria Land. It was named by the New Zealand Geographic Board in 1994 for Charles Bowden, first chairman of the Ross Dependency Committee during Sir Edmund Hillary's South Pole Expedition, part of the Commonwealth Trans-Antarctic Expedition in 1957. Bowden also served as a member of the Parliament of New Zealand until 1955.

References
 

Glaciers of Scott Coast